Winnowie Station is a pastoral lease that operates as a sheep station in South Australia.

 
Brothers Samuel and Robert Stuckey  in partnership with E. C. Randall acquired Winnowie in 1857. By 1859 the Stuckeys owned the property outright. Drought struck the area in 1864 and the stock was removed from the property and taken to Manuwalkaninna Station.

At some time later the property was acquired by G. W. Luxmoore who in turn sold it in 1872 to Thomas Elder for £1,125.

See also
List of ranches and stations

References

Pastoral leases in South Australia
Stations (Australian agriculture)
Far North (South Australia)